Thomas Philips (October 1671 – 1731) was an MP from 1692 to 1693 for Clonmines, a Parliament of Ireland constituency.

References

1671 births
1731 deaths
Irish MPs 1692–1693
Members of the Parliament of Ireland (pre-1801) for County Wexford constituencies